The 1962 Iowa Hawkeyes football team was an American football team that represented the University of Iowa in the 1962 Big Ten Conference football season. In its second season under head coach Jerry Burns, the Hawkeyes compiled a 4–5 record (3–3 against Big Ten opponents), tied for fifth place in the Big Ten, and were outscored by opponents by a total of 166 to 127. The team played its home games at Iowa Stadium in Iowa City, Iowa.

Halfback Larry Ferguson was the team captain and was also selected as the team's most valuable player. The team's statistical leaders included quarterback Matt Szykowny with 737 passing yards, Larry Ferguson with 547 rushing yards, Paul Krause with 214 receiving yards, and Cloyd Webb with 12 points scored. Three Hawkeyes were recognized by the Associated Press (AP) and/or the United Press International (UPI) on the 1962 All-Big Ten Conference football team: Larry Ferguson (AP-2, UPI-1); guard Earl McQuiston (UPI-2); and guard Wally Hilgenberg (AP-3).

Schedule

Roster

Game summaries

Oregon State

USC

Ohio State

Michigan

1963 NFL Draft

References

Iowa
Iowa Hawkeyes football seasons
Iowa Hawkeyes